Nabob is a brand of coffee produced by Kraft Foods and sold in Canada since 1896.  Nabob produces several different blends of coffee which are available in a typical Canadian supermarket.

History
The Nabob Coffee Company originated in Vancouver, British Columbia, in 1896. Its coffee was processed and packaged in the factory of food manufacturing company Kelly Douglas Limited. The name refers to the Anglo-Indian word nabob, a term for a conspicuously wealthy man who made his fortune in the Orient during the British colonial era.

Nabob was purchased by German firm Jacobs in 1976. In 1978, the new owners extended the Nabob brand into Central and Eastern Canada and by 1986 Nabob had made its way all across Canada, Quebec being the last province to receive the brand. 

In 1994, the Nabob brand was purchased by Kraft Foods.

Tassimo product development
Since 2006, Nabob has been the primary coffee brand for the Tassimo coffee maker in Canada. Tassimo launched its brewing system with Nabob T Discs using Tassimo's barcode concept. Nabob offers twelve different types of Tassimo discs which range from their light-bodied breakfast blend to their espresso. Nabob's lattes and cappuccinos include an extra T Disc of condensed milk product on top of Nabob's own disc.

Blends

Dark roasts
 Nabob Full City Dark
 Nabob Golden Java Sumatra
 Nabob Gastown Grind
 Nabob Midnight Eclipse
 Nabob Espresso

Medium roasts
 Nabob Breakfast Blend
 Nabob Tradition
 Nabob Tradition Swiss Water Decaffeinated
 Nabob Summit 100% Colombian 
 Nabob Summit 100% Colombian Swiss Water Decaffeinated
 Nabob Organic

References

External links
 

Kraft Foods brands
Coffee brands
1896 establishments in British Columbia
Canadian brands
Canadian companies established in 1896